Three Artillerymen at the Opera (French: Trois artilleurs à l'opéra) is a 1938 French comedy film directed by André Chotin and starring Pierre Larquey, Roland Toutain and Paul Azaïs.

The film's sets were designed by the art director René Renoux.

Cast
 Pierre Larquey as Zéphitard  
 Roland Toutain as Jacques Dancourt  
 Paul Azaïs as Billardon 
 Louis Baron fils as Badaquin  
 Georges Bever as Le brigadier  
 Marcel Carpentier as Ducouret  
 Marguerite de Morlaye as La vieille dame  
 Irène de Trebert as Nicole Ducouret  
 Paul Demange as Le greffier  
 François Dupriet 
 Maxime Fabert as Un soldat  
 Zizi Festerat  
 Philippe Grall as Un soldat  
 Denise Grey as Paulette  
 Albert Malbert as Le brigadier de police  
 Maurice Marceau as Un soldat  
 Frédéric Mariotti as Le chauffeur  
 Milly Mathis as La patronne de l'hôtel  
 Palau as L'adjudant  
 Rittche 
 Betty Stresa 
 Marguerite Templey as Madame Ducouret

References

Bibliography 
 Rège, Philippe. Encyclopedia of French Film Directors, Volume 1. Scarecrow Press, 2009.

External links 
 

1938 films
French comedy films
1938 comedy films
1930s French-language films
Films directed by André Chotin
French black-and-white films
1930s French films